Captain Marcos Lemos (died 2009) was a Greek shipping magnate and racehorse owner who was an important figure on the racing scene in the 1970s and 1980s. In the 1980s he sold his Warren Park stud farm at Newmarket to Gerald Carroll of the Carroll Group for £7 million. Lemos's horse Julio Mariner won the 1978 St Leger.

See also
Clive Brittain
Lemos family
Costas Lemos

References 

2009 deaths
Year of birth missing
Greek racehorse owners and breeders
Greek businesspeople in shipping
Marcos